A general election will be held in the U.S. state of Kentucky on November 7, 2023.

Few Democratic candidates have announced a run for the statewide offices. The Lexington Herald-Leader attributed this to Kentucky's strong Republican lean and the fact that Republicans gained seats in the Kentucky State Legislature in 2022. However, Democrats have pointed to recent victories by liberal judges in nonpartisan elections and the defeat of a 2022 ballot measure that would have removed abortion rights from the Kentucky Constitution as signs that they can still win in the state. In addition to the candidates listed below, former state representative Attica Scott was speculated as a potential statewide candidate but said she would not seek any office in 2023.

Governor

Incumbent Governor Andy Beshear is running for re-election.

Attorney General

Incumbent Attorney General Daniel Cameron is running for governor.

Kentucky State Representative for the 43rd District Pamela Stevenson announced a run to succeed Cameron. She is the only high-profile state-level Democrat (barring Andy Beshear and Jacqueline Coleman) to announce a run for statewide office.

Russell Coleman, former U.S. Attorney for the Western District of Kentucky is the only Republican candidate to have declared a run.

Secretary of State
Incumbent Secretary of State Michael Adams is running for re-election.

Republican primary

Candidates

Declared
Michael Adams, incumbent Secretary of State
Stephen Knipper
Allen Maricle, former state representative (1994–1998)

Democratic primary

Candidates

Declared
Buddy Wheatley, former state representative (2019–2023)

Declined
Neville Blakemore, construction executive and candidate for state treasurer in 2015

Treasurer
Incumbent Treasurer Allison Ball is term-limited and cannot seek re-election. She is running for state auditor.

Republican primary

Candidates

Declared
Andrew Cooperrider, businessman and candidate for state senate in 2022
Mark Metcalf
OJ Oleka, former deputy state treasurer and president of the Association of Independent Kentucky Colleges and Universities

Endorsements

Democratic primary

Candidates

Declared
Michael Bowman, special assistant to Lieutenant Governor Jacqueline Coleman, former bank manager, and nominee for state treasurer in 2019

Declined
Neville Blakemore, construction executive and candidate for state treasurer in 2015
Matthew Lehman, pharmaceutical executive and nominee for Kentucky's 4th congressional district in 2022

Auditor of Public Accounts
Incumbent Auditor Mike Harmon is term-limited and cannot seek re-election. He is running for governor.

Republican primary

Candidates

Declared
Allison Ball, state treasurer
Derek Petteys

Democratic primary

Candidates

Declared
Kim Reeder, tax attorney

Agriculture Commissioner
Incumbent Agriculture Commissioner Ryan Quarles is running for governor.

Republican primary

Candidates

Declared
Richard Heath, state representative and candidate for agriculture commissioner in 2015
Jonathan Shell, former majority leader of the Kentucky House of Representatives

Democratic primary

Candidates

Declared
Sierra Enlow, economic development consultant and former Louisville Economic Development Manager
Mikael Malone

Declined
Rocky Adkins, senior advisor to Governor Andy Beshear, former minority leader of the Kentucky House of Representatives, and candidate for governor in 2019

See also
 Elections in Kentucky
 Politics of Kentucky
 Political party strength in Kentucky

References

External links

 
Kentucky